London Grammar are an English indie pop band formed in Nottingham in 2009. The band consists of Hannah Reid, Dan Rothman and Dominic “Dot” Major. Their debut extended play, Metal & Dust, was released in February 2013 by Metal & Dust Recordings, while their debut album, If You Wait, was released a few months later in September. The album reached No. 2 on the UK Albums Chart and was certified Double Platinum by the British Phonographic Industry (BPI). The band's second studio album, Truth Is a Beautiful Thing, was released in June 2017, reaching No. 1 on the UK Albums Chart. The latest album,
Californian Soil, was released on 16 April 2021 and became their second-consecutive No. 1 album in the United Kingdom.

History

2009–2012: Early career
Vocalist Hannah Reid and guitarist Dan Rothman are originally from London and met in the Ancaster Hall student residence at the University of Nottingham during their first year in 2009. Rothman saw that Reid played the guitar and contacted her to see if she wanted to collaborate. They were joined by Northampton native Dominic “Dot” Major (keyboard, djembe, drums) a year later, after he began playing music together with Rothman. They chose the name as "not only was it where we're from, but London is also so international and multicultural that it actually felt like quite a universal name in a way."

After completing their studies in mid-2010, the trio moved down to London to pursue a career in music. By the end of the year, they were managed by Conor Wheeler, who began promoting them. The band began by playing low-key gigs at local bars, honing their material. They soon found themselves noticed by a number of A&R people, and they were signed with the Ministry of Sound while Big Life took over the management duties in the second half of 2013. In the same year, the trio did some early recordings with Rollo Armstrong of Faithless and Liam Howe of Sneaker Pimps. Later in the year, the band continued to work with Tim Bran of Dreadzone and Roy Kerr, and by the end of the year, most of the recording had been completed. On 12 November 2012, the trio posted their song "Hey Now" on YouTube; it immediately received a huge amount of attention.

2013–2016: If You Wait
Their EP Metal & Dust followed in February 2013, and it made the top five of the iTunes chart in Australia. It created a lot of interest, and the band received significant airplay on national radio. They released their single "Wasting My Young Years" in June 2013, peaking at No. 31 on the UK Singles Chart. The band was also featured on Disclosure's album Settle with the track "Help Me Lose My Mind", released in June 2013. The band has recorded two live sessions for Radio 1, and they played at 10 summer 2013 European music festivals. In September 2013, Reid was the subject of a Radio 1 Breakfast Show Twitter post, which was criticised for being sexist. The backlash forced the corporation to apologise, while the trio "decided to stay out of it".

On 1 September 2013, they released "Strong", which peaked at No. 16 on the UK Singles Chart. The song was later used in the 2014 American TV series Reckless for its second episode, "Parting Shots". On 9 September 2013, they released their debut studio album, If You Wait, which peaked at No. 2 on both the UK Albums Chart and Australian Albums Chart, as well as at No. 11 on the French Albums Chart, No. 13 on the Irish Albums Chart and No. 22 on the New Zealand Albums Chart. The band is signed to Columbia Records in the United States. On 8 December 2013, a single for the album, "Nightcall" was released. Their cover was used again in Reckless in its last episode, "Civil Wars Part 2".

On 13 January 2014, the band performed "Strong" and "Wasting My Young Years" on Late Night with Jimmy Fallon, marking their debut performance on American television. On 1 April 2014, the Official Charts Company announced that London Grammar's If You Wait was the fifth top-selling album of 2014 so far, with sales of over 138,000 copies (356,000 total). London Grammar won an Ivor Novello Award in the Best Song Musically and Lyrically category for "Strong". And later in 2014, they won two awards – "Independent Breakthrough of the Year" and "PPL Award for Most Played New Independent Act" – at the AIM Independent Music Awards.

On 2 September 2014, French fashion house Dior released an advertisement campaign for J'Adore that featured the song "Hey Now" (The Shoes remix).

After the 2016 acquisition of Ministry of Sound Recordings by Sony Music, London Grammar's catalogue remained to be distributed by Universal Music Group in most of the world and Because Music in France.

2017–2019: Truth Is a Beautiful Thing
On 1 January 2017, London Grammar shared the single "Rooting for You", marking the group's first new music since their debut album in 2013. A month later, on 1 February, they shared the second single, "Big Picture", via their Facebook page, which they also performed on Later with Jools Holland.

Truth Is a Beautiful Thing was released on 9 June 2017. The album was largely recorded with producers Paul Epworth and Greg Kurstin. It charted at No. 1 in the UK.

During the autumn of 2017, the band's cover version of the Chris Isaak song "Wicked Game" was used in the trailer for the BBC series Peaky Blinders.

In March 2018, the band's song “Hell to the Liars” from album Truth Is a Beautiful Thing was featured on Season 4 of the E! show The Royals in the second episode, “Confess Yourself to Heaven”.

In June 2019, London Grammar was featured on "Let You Know", a song by Australian musician Flume.

2020–present: Californian Soil 
On 19 August 2020, London Grammar released "Baby It's You", their first single since 2017. This was followed by the premiere of "Californian Soil" on 1 October before the launch of their third album, also titled Californian Soil, which was released on 16 April 2021. "America" was one of the first songs written for the album, and was written about letting go of the past. The launch of "Californian Soil" was accompanied by a full live performance on YouTube. London Grammar were nominated for the "Best Group" at the Brit Awards 2022.

Musical style
London Grammar's music has been described as "a blend of ambient, ethereal and classical sounds" with melancholy guitar, soaring vocals, plaintive lyrics, and often displaying trip-hop and dance influences. Hannah Reid's powerful, haunting vocals – prominent on all of London Grammar's tracks released to date – are often compared to those of Judie Tzuke and Florence Welch. The songs are a collaborative effort, as Reid explains: "I write the lyrics and the top lines. But the songs initiate from all three of us. Dot will write a piano part or a music score. Dan will add some guitars." She describes the songs as "emotionally affected" and said that she "writes about people who come in and out of my life."

Discography

Studio albums
 If You Wait (2013)
 Truth Is a Beautiful Thing (2017)
 Californian Soil (2021)

Awards and nominations
{| class=wikitable
|-
! Year !! Awards !! Work !! Category !! Result !! Ref. 
|-
| rowspan=2|2013
| rowspan=6|UK Music Video Awards
| rowspan=2|"Wasting My Young Years"
| Best Visual Effects in a Video 
| 
| rowspan=2|
|-
| rowspan=2|Best Alternative Video - UK
| 
|-
| rowspan=12|2014
| rowspan=2|"Nightcall"
| 
|rowspan=4|
|-
| Best Cinematography in a Video
| 
|-
| If You Wait
| Best Music Ad – TV or Online
| 
|-
| rowspan=3|Themselves
| Best Video Artist
| 
|-
| Brit Awards
| British Breakthrough Act
| 
|
|-
| Q Awards
| Best New Act 
| 
|
|-
| Ivor Novello Awards
| rowspan=2|"Strong"
| Best Song Musically & Lyrically
| 
| 
|-
| rowspan=5|AIM Independent Music Awards
| Independent Track of the Year
| 
|rowspan=3|
|-
| If You Wait
|Independent Album of the Year
| 
|-
| rowspan=3|Themselves
| Best Live Act
| 
|-
| Independent Breakthrough of the Year
| 
|rowspan=2|
|-
| Most Played New Independent Act
| 
|-
| rowspan=2|2015
| International Dance Music Awards
| "Hey Now" (Sasha Remix)
| Best House/Garage/Deep House Track
| 
|
|-
| The Music Producers Guild Awards
| If You Wait
| UK Album of the Year
| 
|
|-
| 2017
| UK Music Video Awards
| "Rooting for You"
| Best Live Session
| 
| 
|-
| 2018
| Brit Awards
| Themselves
| Best British Group
| 
|

References

External links
 
 

2012 establishments in England
Alumni of British Youth Music Theatre
Because Music artists
British indie pop groups
British musical trios
Columbia Records artists
Dew Process artists
Dream pop musical groups
English art rock groups
English electronic music groups
Ministry of Sound artists
Musical groups from Nottingham
Trip hop groups